PANSAT (Petite Amateur Navy Satellite, also known as OSCAR 34) was an amateur radio satellite. It was launched by Space Shuttle Discovery during the STS-95 mission as part of the third International Extreme Ultraviolet Hitchhiker (IEH-3) mission, on 30 October 1998 from Kennedy Space Center, Florida.

The satellite was built by students from the Naval Postgraduate School in Monterey, California. It offered the possibility of packet radio transmission in BPSK or Direct-Sequence Spread Spectrum in the 70 cm band. The satellite was configured in a sphere-like shape, featuring 26 sides used for solar cell and antenna placement. The spacecraft supplied direct-sequence, spread-spectrum modulation with an operating center frequency of 436.5 MHz, a bit rate of 9600 bps and 9 MB of message storage.

References

Satellites orbiting Earth
Amateur radio satellites
Spacecraft launched by the Space Shuttle
Spacecraft launched in 1998